This is a list of people and other topics appearing on the cover of Time magazine in the 1970s. Time was first published in 1923. As Time became established as one of the United States' leading news magazines, an appearance on the cover of Time became an indicator of notability, fame or notoriety. Such features were accompanied by articles.

For the first time since 1960, all of the issues had been back to its standard Monday scheduled time frame.

For other decades, see Lists of covers of Time magazine.

1970

January 5 – Middle Americans, Time Man and Woman of the Year
January 12 – The Band
January 19 – Najeeb Halaby
January 26 – Biafra: End of a Rebellion
February 2 – Barry Commoner
February 9 – The American Indian
February 16 – Jane, Henry & Peter Fonda
February 23 – Anita Caspary & James Shannon
March 2 – Japan's Expo '70
March 9 – Integration
March 16 – Heroin Hits the Young
March 23 – Inefficient America
March 30 – U.S. Postal Strike
April 6 – Jesse Jackson
April 13 – Günter Grass
April 20 – Richard Nixon
April 27 – Astronauts Lovell, Haise & Swigert
May 4 – Leonid Brezhnev
May 11 – Cambodian Invasion
May 18 – U.S. Student Protest
May 25 – William Masters & Virginia Johnson
June 1 – Arthur Burns
June 8 – Richard Nixon, Henry Kissinger, John N. Mitchell, John Ehrlichman & H. R. Haldeman
June 15 – Mike Nichols
June 22 – Middle East Turmoil
June 29 – Edward Heath
July 6 – Fight over the Flag
July 13 – Jerry Vernon Wilson
July 20 – Henry Ford II
July 27 – Alaska
August 3 – Aged in America
August 10 – William P. Rogers
August 17 – Generation Gap
August 24 – Howard Stein
August 31 – Kate Millett
September 7 – Elliott Gould
September 14 – John Fairchild
September 21 – Dawson's Field hijackings
September 28 – The Arab Guerillas
October 5 – Richard Nixon
October 12 – Gamal Abdel Nasser
October 19 – Salvador Allende
October 26 – Battle for the Senate 
November 2 – The Urban Guerillas
November 9 – Blue Collar Power
November 16 – Adlai Stevenson III, John V. Tunney, James L. Buckley & Bill Brock
November 23 – Big Bird
November 30 – Martha Mitchell
December 7 – American POWs
December 14 – U.S. Inflation
December 21 – Elmo Zumwalt
December 28 – The U.S. Family

1971

January 4 – Willy Brandt, Man of the Year
January 11 – Ali MacGraw
January 18 – U.S. Prisons
January 25 – Philip & Daniel Berrigan
February 1 – Carl Albert
February 8 – The Welfare Maze
February 15 – Creighton Abrams
February 22 – The Cooling of America
March 1 – James Taylor
March 8 – Joe Frazier & Muhammad Ali
March 15 – Suburbia
March 22 – George C. Scott
March 29 – Konstantin Katushev, Kirill Mazurov, Leonid Brezhnev, Alexander Shelepin & Dmitry Polyansky
April 5 – Aerospace Industry
April 12 – William Calley
April 19 – The New Genetics
April 26 – Yanks in Peking
May 3 – Alexis Smith
May 10 – Akio Morita
May 17 – Anwar Sadat
May 24 – The Graduate, 1971
May 31 – Jimmy Carter
June 7 – Dick Cavett
June 14 – Eddie Cox and Tricia Nixon
June 21 – The Jesus Revolution
June 28 – The Pentagon Papers
July 5 – Daniel Ellsberg
July 12 – Joe Colombo
July 19 – Lee Trevino
July 26 – Henry Kissinger & Richard Nixon
August 2 – Pakistan Refugees
August 9 – David Scott, James Irwin & Alfred Worden
August 16 – George Shultz & Arthur Burns
August 23 – Vida Blue
August 30 – Richard Nixon
September 6 – George Meany
September 13 – Edmund Muskie
September 20 – B. F. Skinner
September 27 – Attica Prison Riots
October 4 – Emperor Hirohito
October 11 – The New Spy
October 18 – John Connally
October 25 – Jesus Christ Superstar
November 1 – William Rehnquist & Lewis Powell, Jr.
November 8 – Chou En-lai
November 15 – Battle over Busing
November 22 – Beverly Sills
November 29 – Edward Kennedy
December 6 – Indira Gandhi & Yahya Khan
December 13 – Space Exploration
December 20 – Birth of Bangladesh
December 27 – The Good Samaritan (stained glass depiction by Leandro Velasco)

1972

January 3 – Richard Nixon, Man of the Year
January 10 – IRA Fighter
January 17 – Roger Staubach & Bob Griese
January 24 – Howard Hughes
January 31 – Flip Wilson
February 7 – Henry Kissinger
February 14 – Robert Coles
February 21 – Clifford Irving
February 28 – Liza Minnelli
March 6 – Nixon in China
March 13 – Is the U.S. Going Broke?
March 20 – The American Woman
March 27 – George Wallace
April 3 – Jack Anderson
April 10 – What It Means to be Jewish
April 17 – Viet Nam
April 24 – Gang War
May 1 – Richard Nixon
May 8 – George McGovern
May 15 – Võ Nguyên Giáp
May 22 – Haiphong Harbor
May 29 – Leonid Brezhnev
June 5 – Moscow Summit
June 12 – Kemmons Wilson
June 19 – The Occult Revival
June 26 – Edwin Land
July 3 – Woody Allen
July 10 – Johnny Bench
July 17 – Kenneth Elstein
July 24 – George McGovern & Thomas Eagleton
July 31 – Boris Spassky & Bobby Fischer
August 7 – Thomas Eagleton
August 14 – Sargent Shriver & George McGovern
August 21 – Sex and the Teenager
August 28 – Richard Nixon & Spiro Agnew
September 4 – Global War on Heroin
September 11 – Mark Spitz
September 18 – Murder at the Olympics
September 25 – Redd Foxx, Bea Arthur & Carroll O'Connor
October 2 – Richard Nixon & George McGovern
October 9 – Pat Nixon & Eleanor McGovern
October 16 – Joe Namath
October 23 – Campaign Financing
October 30 – Henry Kissinger
November 6 – The Shape of Peace
November 13 – Richard Bach
November 20 – Richard Nixon
November 27 – Ernest and Julio Gallo
December 4 – Liv Ullmann
December 11 – Don Shula
December 18 – Nutrition
December 25 – Skiing

1973

January 1 – Henry Kissinger & Richard Nixon, Time Men of the Year
January 8 – The Bombing Question
January 15 – Crisis in Congress
January 22 – Marlon Brando
January 29 – Nixon's Second Term with Zhou Enlai, Leonid Brezhnev, Nguyễn Văn Thiệu, Henry Kissinger, Lê Đức Thọ, South Vietnamese soldier, American POW & Vietnam veteran protester
February 5 – Vietnam Cease-Fire with Lê Đức Thọ & Henry Kissinger
February 12 – Ian Anderson, Roberta Flack, Harry Nilsson & Carole King
February 19 – POW Families
February 26 – George Shultz
March 5 – Carlos Castaneda
March 12 – Europe
March 19 – Robert A. Good
March 26 – L. Patrick Gray
April 2 – Muammar Gaddafi
April 9 – Food Prices
April 16 – Sam Ervin
April 23 – Pedro Arrupe
April 30 – The Watergate Scandal
May 7 – Georg Solti
May 14 – Richard Nixon
May 21 – John Mitchell
May 28 – Watergate Revelations
June 4 – Richard Nixon
June 11 – Secretariat
June 18 – The U.S. Economy
June 25 – Leonid Brezhnev
July 2 – John Dean
July 9 – John Dean & Richard Nixon
July 16 – Marilyn Monroe & Norman Mailer
July 23 – John Mitchell
July 30 – Richard Nixon & Sam Ervin
August 6 – Constitutional Challenge
August 13 – Wendell Anderson
August 20 – Spiro Agnew & Richard Nixon
August 27 – Nixon's Problems
September 3 – Henry Kissinger
September 10 – Bobby Riggs
September 17 – Hamburger Empire
September 24 – Salvador Allende
October 1 – Spiro Agnew
October 8 – Spiro Agnew
October 15 – Middle East War
October 22 – Gerald Ford
October 29 – Archibald Cox & Richard Nixon
November 5 – Richard Nixon
November 12 – Nixon's Jury: The People
November 19 – King Faisal of Saudi Arabia
November 26 – Peter Falk
December 3 – The Big Freeze
December 10 – Rose Mary Woods
December 17 – Gerald & Betty Ford
December 24 – The Child's World: Christmas 1973
December 31 – The Big Car

1974

January 7 – John Sirica, Man of the Year
January 14 – Inside the Brain
January 21 – William E. Simon
January 28 – The Telltale Tape
February 4 – Tip O'Neill
February 11 – James Schlesinger
February 18 – Exxon
February 25 – Aleksandr Solzhenitsyn
March 4 – The Psychics
March 11 – Leon Jaworski
March 18 – Robert Redford & Mia Farrow in The Great Gatsby
March 25 – James D. St. Clair
April 1 – Henry Kissinger with Henry M. Jackson, Mao Zedong, Georges Pompidou, Hafez al-Assad, Anwar Sadat, Golda Meir & Leonid Brezhnev
April 8 – World Inflation
April 15 – Richard Nixon
April 22 – Alcoholism
April 29 – Patty Hearst
May 6 – Merle Haggard
May 13 – Richard Nixon
May 20 – Nixon's Collapsing Presidency
May 27 – Mid-East Massacres
June 3 – Reggie Jackson
June 10 – Henry Kissinger
June 17 – Middle-Class Blacks
June 24 – Richard Nixon & Anwar Sadat
July 1 – Richard Nixon, Henry M. Jackson & Leonid Brezhnev
July 8 – The Press: Fair or Foul
July 15 – Leadership in America
July 22 – Nixon & The Supreme Court
July 29 – Republicans (Charles E. Wiggins, Robert McClory, William Cohen) & Impeachment 
August 5 – Peter W. Rodino
August 12 – Jack Nicholson
August 19 – Gerald Ford
August 26 – Gerald Ford
September 2 – Nelson Rockefeller
September 9 – The Economy
September 16 – Richard Nixon
September 23 – Gerald Ford
September 30 – William Colby
October 7 – Betty Ford, Joan Kennedy & Pat Nixon
October 14 – Gerald Ford
October 21 – Jerry Brown
October 28 – Mary Tyler Moore & Valerie Harper
November 4 – Shah of Iran Mohammad Reza Pahlavi
November 11 – Yasser Arafat
November 18 – David L. Boren, Jerry Brown, Dale Bumpers, Hugh Carey, Michael Dukakis, John Glenn, Ella Grasso & Gary Hart
November 25 – The Big Raise. Labor & Inflation
December 2 – Yitzhak Rabin
December 9 – The Recession
December 16 – Joni Mitchell
December 23 – The American Pet
December 30 – Biblical Magi

1975

January 6 – Faisal of Saudi Arabia, Man of the Year
January 13 – Dr. John Laragh
January 20 – Gerald Ford
January 27 – Gerald Ford & Carl Albert doctoring the Economy
February 3 – Chou En-Lai
February 10 – Rebates and Smaller Cars
February 17 – Henry M. Jackson
February 24 – Bernie Parent
March 3 – The World Arms Trade
March 10 – American Jews & Israel
March 17 – Cher 
March 24 – Indochina
March 31 – Vietnam
April 7 – America (Henry Kissinger) & the World (Faisal of Saudi Arabia, Nguyễn Văn Thiệu, Yitzhak Rabin & Anwar Sadat)
April 14 – Vietnam
April 21 – Gerald Ford
April 28 – Jimmy Connors
May 5 – North Vietnamese Victory
May 12 – Ho Chi Minh
May 19 – Mikhail Baryshnikov
May 26 – Mayaguez Incident
June 2 – Old Age: How to help our parents
June 9 – Anwar Sadat
June 16 – Margaux Hemingway
June 23 – Scene from Jaws
June 30 – Crime
July 7 – Elton John
July 14 – Adam Smith 
July 21 – U.S. & Soviet hands shaking
July 28 – The Ford family in the White House
August 4 – Gerald Ford & Leonid Brezhnev
August 11 – Lisbon's Troika: Otelo Saraiva de Carvalho, Vasco dos Santos Goncalves & Francisco da Costa Gomes
August 18 – Charles O. Finley
August 25 – Yitzhak Rabin, Henry Kissinger & Anwar Sadat
September 1 – Earthquakes
September 8 – Air Force Sergeant Leonard Matlovich 
September 15 – Lynette Alice Fromme
September 22 – Busing Battle
September 29 – Patricia Hearst, alias Tania
October 6 – Gerald Ford
October 13 – The Maharishi
October 20 – Abraham Beame
October 27 – Bruce Springsteen
November 3 – Juan Carlos 
November 10 – Sarah Caldwell
November 17 – Donald Rumsfeld, George H. W. Bush, Gerald Ford & Henry Kissinger
November 24 – Ronald Reagan
December 1 – Bloomingdale's shoppers
December 8 – L. C. Greenwood, Dwight White, Ernie Holmes & Joe Greene
December 15 – Marisa Berenson
December 22 – J. Edgar Hoover
December 29 – Mother Teresa

1976

January 5 – Betty Ford, Carla Hills, Ella Grasso, Barbara Jordan, Susie Sharp, Jill Ker Conway, Billie Jean King, Susan Brownmiller, Addie Wyatt, Kathleen Byerly, Carol Sutton, Alison Cheek, Women of the Year
January 12 – Scene from Days of Our Lives
January 19 – Teng Hsiao-p'ing
January 26 – Daniel Patrick Moynihan
February 2 – Dorothy Hamill
February 9 – Doonesbury
February 16 – F. Lee Bailey
February 23 – Lockheed Scandal
March 1 – Gore Vidal
March 8 – Jimmy Carter with Mo Udall, Henry M. Jackson, George Wallace & Hubert Humphrey
March 15 – Americans on the Move
March 22 – American Chic (model Carol Gustafson)
March 29 – Dustin Hoffman & Robert Redford
April 5 – The Porno Plague
April 12 – The Middle East Crisis
April 19 – Howard Hughes
April 26 – Baseball player Babe Ruth
May 3 – Royal Families
May 10 – Jimmy Carter
May 17 – Gerald Ford & Ronald Reagan
May 24 – U.S. Catholicism
May 31 – Paul McCartney
June 7 – West Point Scandal
June 14 – Enrico Berlinguer
June 21 – Jimmy Carter, Ronald Reagan & Gerald Ford
June 28 – Rediscovering America
July 4 – Thomas Jefferson
July 5 – Birthday Issue
July 12 – The Bugs are Coming
July 19 – The Democratic Convention
July 26 – Jimmy Carter & Walter Mondale
August 2 – Nadia Comăneci
August 9 – Gerald Ford
August 16 – Disease Detectives: Tracing the Philly Killer
August 23 – The G.O.P. in Trouble
August 30 – The G.O.P Strategy (Gerald Ford & Bob Dole)
September 6 – Sex and Tennis
September 13 – Campaign Kickoff
September 20 – Mao Tse-tung
September 27 – The South
October 4 – Jimmy Carter & Gerald Ford
October 11 – Ian Smith
October 18 – Gerald Ford
October 25 – Publicity still of Jessica Lange in King Kong
November 1 – Voting Your Pocketbook
November 8 – Jimmy Carter & Gerald Ford
November 15 – Jimmy Carter
November 22 – Charlie's Angels (Farrah Fawcett, Kate Jackson & Jaclyn Smith)
November 29 – Robert Rauschenberg
December 6 – Gambling Goes Legit
December 13 – Howard Hughes
December 20 – Hamilton Jordan, Walter Mondale & Jimmy Carter
December 27 – Stars: Where Life Begins

1977

January 3 – Jimmy Carter, Man of the Year
January 10 – The Super Bowl: the Great American Spectacle – Two football players from Oakland Raiders and Minnesota Vikings
January 17 – Rupert Murdoch with Clay Felker
January 24 – America's Mood 
January 31 – The Big Freeze 
February 7 – Amy Carter & her dog
February 14 – Alex Haley & two Roots miniseries characters 
February 21 – Andrei Sakharov
February 28 – Linda Ronstadt
March 7 – Idi Amin 
March 14 – Marabel Morgan
March 21 – Chiang Ching & Mao Zedong 
March 28 – Lily Tomlin
April 4 – James Schlesinger
April 11 – Air Travel: How Safe?
April 18 – DNA Furor – Tinkering with Life 
April 25 – Jimmy Carter 
May 2 – Uncle Sam character
May 9 – Richard Nixon & David Frost
May 16 – Mafia
May 23 – Harold Brown
May 30 – Menachem Begin
June 6 – Jody Powell & Hamilton Jordan
June 13 – Peter Frampton, Steve Cauthen, Wally Amos & Colleen McCullough
June 20 – James Earl Ray
June 27 – Adolfo Suárez
July 4 – Summer
July 11 – Youth Crime 
July 18 – Rod Carew
July 25 – Blackout '77: Once More With Looting 
August 1 – Sociobiology: A new theory of behavior 
August 8 – Jimmy Carter, Leonid Brezhnev, Menachem Begin, Anwar Sadat, Hua Kuo-feng & Helmut Schmidt
August 15 – Arthur Ochs Sulzberger
August 22 – Panama Canal & Uncle Sam
August 29 – The Underclass
September 5 – Fred Silverman
September 12 – Sky-High Housing
September 19 – Bert Lance & Jimmy Carter
September 26 – Diane Keaton
October 3 – John le Carré
October 10 – Revolt of the Old: The Battle Over Forced Retirement
October 17 – Jimmy Carter & Moshe Dayan
October 24 – Mstislav Rostropovich
October 31 – Hanns Martin Schleyer, Jürgen Schumann, woman terrorist, returned hostages
November 7 – Richard Leakey & a Homo Habilis
November 14 – High School in Trouble 
November 21 – John Vorster
November 28 – Anwar Sadat
December 5 – After Houston: What Next for Women (Peggy Kokernot)
December 12 – Dixy Lee Ray
December 19 – The Cooking Craze
December 26 – Jesus and various faithfuls

1978

January 2 – Anwar Sadat, Man of the Year
January 9 – Burt Reynolds & Clint Eastwood
January 16 – Super Bowl XII 
January 23 – Robert Byrd
January 30 – Michael Blumenthal
February 6 – Stansfield Turner
February 13 – Pierre Trudeau & René Lévesque
February 20 – The Computer Society 
February 27 – Muhammad Ali
March 6 – Cheryl Tiegs
March 13 – Socialism
March 20 – Coal Crisis
March 27 – Menachem Begin & Yasser Arafat 
April 3 – John Travolta
April 10 – Lawyers
April 17 – The Fantastic World of Steinberg – Saul Steinberg drawings
April 24 – Cyrus Vance
May 1 – Gelsey Kirkland
May 8 – Attack on the Navy
May 15 – Prince Charles
May 22 – Prince Fahd
May 29 – Steve Cauthen
June 5 – Politics of Africa (Leonid Brezhnev, Fidel Castro, Valéry Giscard d'Estaing & Jimmy Carter)
June 12 – Joseph Califano
June 19 – Howard Jarvis
June 26 – Women in Sports 
July 3 – Warren Beaty
July 10 – What Bakke Means
July 17 – G. William Miller
July 24 – Anatoli Shcharansky
July 31 – The Test-Tube Baby: Birth Watch in Britain 
August 7 – Lobbyists
August 14 – New Era in the Air: Cheap Fares, Crowded Flights
August 21 – Baggio, Willebrands, Bertoli, Pignedoli & Pironio
August 28 – Mario Puzo
September 4 – John Paul I
September 11 – Menachem Begin
September 18 – Shah of Iran Mohammad Reza Pahlavi
September 25 – Menachem Begin & Anwar Sadat
October 2 – Jimmy Carter
October 9 – John Paul I
October 16 – Hispanic Americans
October 23 – Elections '78: The Tax Shelters 
October 30 – John Paul II
November 6 – Pat Benedict
November 13 – To the Rescue: The battered Dollar 
November 20 – Big Winners: Adding Up the Results – Brown, Bradley, Carey, Kassebaum, Cochran and Thompson
November 27 – Letitia Baldrige
December 4 – Cult of Death (Jonestown deaths)
December 11 – Michel Bergerac
December 18 – Convention Fever
December 25 – Jimmy Carter, Teng Hsiao-ping & Menachem Begin

1979

January 1 – Deng Xiaoping, Man of the Year
January 8 – Philip Johnson
January 15 – Crescent of Crisis: Troubles Beyond Iran
January 22 – Leonid Brezhnev
January 29 – Colombian Connection: Billions in Pot & Coke
February 5 – Teng Hsiao-ping
February 12 – Ayatollah Khomeini
February 19 – Albert Einstein
February 26 – Iran: Anarchy and Exodus 
March 5 – Communists at War: China and Vietnam War & Cambodian–Vietnamese War
March 12 – Robin Williams
March 19 – Jimmy Carter
March 26 – Mideast Peace: Its Risks and Rewards
April 2 – Psychiatry's Depression
April 9 – Nuclear Nightmare: Three Mile Island 
April 16 – Islam: The Militant Revival 
April 23 – How gay Is gay: Homosexuality in America
April 30 – Woody Allen
May 7 – The Oil Game
May 14 – Margaret Thatcher
May 21 – Now The Great Debate: SALT II
May 28 – Medical Costs: Seeking the Cure 
June 4 – Russell Baker
June 11 – Helmut Schmidt
June 18 – John Paul II
June 25 – Jimmy Carter & Leonid Brezhnev
July 2 – The Energy Mess
July 9 – The World Over a Barrel: OPEC's Tightening Oil Squeeze
July 16 – Here Come Skylab!
July 23 – Jimmy Carter
July 30 – Now What?: Carter's Cabinet Purge 
August 6 – Leadership in America: 50 Faces For the Future
August 13 – Diane Lane
August 20 – Judging the Judges: An Outsize Job – and Getting Bigger
August 27 – The Topsy-Turvy Economy: New Ideas to Set It Right
September 3 – Ansel Adams
September 10 – John Connally
September 17 – Cyrus Vance & Fidel Castro
September 24 – Luciano Pavarotti
October 1 – Henry Kissinger 
October 8 – José López Portillo
October 15 – John Paul II
October 22 – Paul Volcker
October 29 – David C. Jones
November 5 – Edward Kennedy
November 12 – Starvation: Deathwatch in Cambodia 
November 19 – Blackmailing the U.S. 
November 26 – Ayatollah Khomeini & Jimmy Carter
December 3 – Attacking America: Fury in Iran, Rescue in Pakistan 
December 10 – Shah of Iran Mohammad Reza Shah
December 17 – The Who (Pete Townshend, Roger Daltrey, John Entwistle & Kenney Jones)
December 24 – The Cooling of America
December 31 – Going... Going... Gone!: The Art and Antique Boom

References

 Time cover search
 Time The Vault

Time magazine (1970s)
1970s
Cover of Time magazine